Said Atabekov is an Kazakhstani artist in the fields of installation, performance and video art, and photography.

Life 
Atabekov was born in 1965 in Bes Terek in the Tashkent Province of Uzbekistan. After his studies at the Shymkent Art College, he continued with the education of upcoming artists and the organization of exhibits of their work.

He began his career when the introduction of perestroika in the Soviet Union which enabled him to make use of the enlarged possibilities of artistic freedom. In this time he founded the collective Kyzyl Traktor (Red Tractor) and experimented with international modernism.

In course of history, his region had been under influence of four strong and often conflicting ideologies: nomadic pantheism, islam, Russian influences and western capitalism. The deeper paradoxes of them can repeatedly be seen in his work, such as from the time of Genghis Khan, during communism and in the time following the dissolution of the Soviet Union.

In 2011 Atabekov was honored with a Prince Claus Award.

Work (selection) 
2004: Ifa gallery, Berlin, Vom roten Stern zur blauen Kuppel
2005: Ifa galerie, Stuttgart, Vom roten Stern zur blauen Kuppel
2005: 51st Venice Biennale, The Experience of Art
2007: Kiasma Museum of Modern Art, Helsinki, Time of the Storytellers
2007: Biennale de Montréal
2008: Yerba Buena Center for the Arts, San Francisco, Tracing Roads Through Central Asia
2008: Winkleman Gallery, New York I Dream of the Stans: New Central Asian Video
2008: ArteEast, Bishkek, Boom Boom - 4th Bishkek International Exhibition of Contemporary Art
2009: Kunsthalle Exnergasse, Vienna, Changing Climate
2009: Musée du Quai Branly, Paris, Photoquai
2011: Museum of Modern Art, Antwerp, Collection XXVII - East from 4°24' MuHKA
2011: 54th Venice Biennale, Central Asian Pavilion
2011: New Museum of Contemporary Art, New York, Ostalgia
2011: 42nd Photo Festival Mannheim-Ludwigshafen-Heidelberg The eye is a lonely hunter: images of humankind
2011: Calvert22, London, Between Heaven and Earth: Contemporary Art from the Centre of Asia
2011:Between Heaven and Earth - Contemporary Art from the Centre of Asia - Calvert22 Foundation, London, England
2011:4 st Fotofestival Mannheim Ludwigshafen_HeidelbergTHE EYE IS A LONELY HUNTER, Germany
2011:Biennale di Venezia - 54th International Art Exhibition - La Biennale di Venezia, Venice
2011:Ostalgia - New Museum of Contemporary Art, New York City, NY
2011:Moving Image" An Art Fair of Contemporary Video Art New York, NY
2012:Migrasophia - Maraya Art Centre - Barjeel Art Foundation, Sharjah
2012:The Eye is a Lonely Hunter – Images of Human Kind - Grimmuseum, Berlin
2012: Centro Videoinsight - Torino,Italy
2013:No-mad-nes In No Man's Land - Eslite Gallery, Taipei
2103:5th Moscow Biennale of Contemporary Art - Bolshe Sveta / More Light - Manege Central Exhibition Hall, Moscow
2013:Primera Bienal del Sur en Panamá 
2013: Emplazando Mundos - Bienal del Sur en Panamá, Panama City
2013:At the Crossroads: Contemporary Art from the Caucasus and Central Asia - Sotheby´s - London, New Bond Street, London, England
2013:The Eye is a Lonely Hunter - Images of Humankind - Fotogalleriet, Oslo
2013:ONE STEP/PE FORWARD Contemporary art exhibition of Kazakhstan's artists in Venice,Italy
2014:Il Piedistallo vuoto. Fantasmi dall’Est Europa - Museo Civico Archeologico di Bologna, Bologna
2014:ArtDubai,UAE

References 
Art Report, reference card with expositions
Kunstaspecte, expositions

Uzbekistani photographers
1965 births
Living people
20th-century Uzbekistani artists
21st-century Uzbekistani artists